John (Johnny) Martin (1822 – 17 May 1892) was a "labourer, carter, merchant, politician, runholder, [and] land speculator".

Early life
Martin was born in Moneymore, County Londonderry, Ireland on 11 November 1822.

Political career

Martin was made a justice of the peace by William Fitzherbert in 1876, and in 1878 was called to the New Zealand Legislative Council by Premier George Grey.

He was to be a member of the Legislative Council from 25 July 1878 to 17 May 1892, when he died. During his 14-year career in the Legislative Council, he only spoke four times, and came to be known as the "silent member".

References 

1822 births
1892 deaths
Members of the New Zealand Legislative Council
Politicians from County Londonderry
Settlers of New Zealand
19th-century New Zealand politicians
Irish emigrants to New Zealand (before 1923)